A-Rosa Silva is a German river cruise ship, cruising in the Rhine – Main – Danube basin. It was built by Neptun Werft GmbH at their shipyard in Warnemünde, Germany, and entered service in 2012. Her sister ship is A-Rosa Flora. Her home port is currently Rostock.

Features
The ship has two restaurants, two lounges and bar, big-chess, Finnish sauna, steam sauna and resting area.

See also
 List of river cruise ships

References

External links

2012 ships
River cruise ships